(Methyl-Co(III) methanol-specific corrinoid protein):coenzyme M methyltransferase (methyltransferase 2, mtaA (gene)) is an enzyme with systematic name methylated methanol-specific corrinoid protein:coenzyme M methyltransferase. This enzyme catalyses the following chemical reaction

 [methyl-Co(III) methanol-specific corrinoid protein] + coenzyme M  methyl-CoM + [Co(I) methanol-specific corrinoid protein]

Free methylcob(I)alamin can substitute for the corrinoid protein in vitro.

References

External links 
 

EC 2.1.1